The Xuanda Expressway (宣大高速公路, Hanyu Pinyin: Xuāndà Gāosù Gōnglù; Approximate Pronunciation: "Shuen-Da Expressway"), is an expressway in China which links Xuanhua in Hebei province with Datong in Shanxi province.

The Xuanda Expressway gets its name by the combination of two one-character Chinese abbreviations of both Xuanhua and Datong (Xuanhua—Xuan, Datong—Da).

Route

Basic route: Junction with G7 Jingla Expressway at Xuanhua - Yangyuan at Shanxi border where it becomes S30 Sunyou Expressway

Status: The entire expressway is complete and open to traffic.

The eastern end of the expressway links with the Jingzhang Expressway to Beijing and Zhangjiakou near Xuanhua, while the western end continues as the Sunyou Expressway, which keeps going to  Datong.

The expressway's route runs slightly southwest, passing through Yangyuan in Hebei before entering Shanxi, continuing west, and reaching Datong.

Speed limit
Variable speed limits are generally . Speed checks are rare.

Tolls
Entire stretch charges tolls. Toll system not networked. Central toll gate at jurisdictional change (Hebei/Shanxi province).

Lanes
4 lanes (2 up, 2 down) throughout.

Surface Conditions
Relatively good.

Traffic
Sparse to uncongested.

History
Little is known about the history of the Xuanda Expressway. However, it was opened in December 2002, as part of China's 9th Five-Year Plan's major construction works. The expressway is often used for coal transport.

Its total length is around 126 kilometres. It forms part of the Jingda Expressway, which is a unified term for the Xuanda Expressway and the Jingzhang Expressway.

Service areas
Xuanhua, Huashaoying, Yangyuan

Detailed itinerary

Expressways in Shanxi
Expressways in Hebei
Xuanhua